Byron Edward Irvin (born December 2, 1966) is an American former professional basketball player. A 6'5" (1.95 m) and 190 lb (86 kg) shooting guard, he was selected by the Portland Trail Blazers in the first round (22nd pick overall) of the 1989 NBA draft. He played college basketball for the Arkansas Razorbacks and Missouri Tigers.

High school
Irvin attended Chicago's Percy Julian High School. In his senior year of high school he averaged 32 points a game, and in one game he scored 50 points.

College career
He played collegiately at the University of Arkansas under legendary coach Eddie Sutton before Sutton left for Kentucky. Irvin was there from 1984/85-1985/86, then transferred to the University of Missouri Played for Hall of Fame Coach Norm Stewart (1987/88-1988/89, after having missed the 1986/87 season). He also received his bachelor's degree from the University of Missouri.

Professional career
Irvin played in NBA for three seasons: 1989-90 for the Portland Trail Blazers and 1990–91 and 1992-93 for the Washington Bullets, averaging 5.2 PPG in his career. 
He also played in the Continental Basketball Association and overseas in Spain, Greece, Israel, Argentina, Switzerland, Philippines, Belgium, Dominican Republic, and Venezuela.

After playing career
Irvin is now a sports agent. He is Senior Vice President of Basketball Relativity Sports, and has represented NBA players such as Shawn Marion, Jason Terry, Al Harrington, Stephen Jackson, Joey Graham, Stephen Graham, Reggie Evans, Kris Humphries, Melvin Ely, Justin Williams, Isaiah Thomas, Nene Hilario, Erick Dampier, Darington Hobson. Rodney White, Matt Carroll, Gerald Green, Antoine Walker, Randy Holcombe. Ricky Davis, Earl Clark. He has negotiated over $550 million in contracts.

Personal life
Irvin is a cousin of former NBA player and current Philadelphia 76ers head coach Doc Rivers.

Notes

External links
Byron Irvin NBA stats @ basketballreference.com

1966 births
Living people
African-American basketball players
American expatriate basketball people in Israel
American expatriate basketball people in Mexico
American expatriate basketball people in the Philippines
American men's basketball players
American sports agents
Arkansas Razorbacks men's basketball players
Basketball players from Chicago
Columbus Horizon players
Fort Wayne Fury players
La Crosse Catbirds players
Magnolia Hotshots players
Mexico Aztecas players
Missouri Tigers men's basketball players
Sportspeople from La Grange, Illinois
Portland Trail Blazers draft picks
Portland Trail Blazers players
Shooting guards
Washington Bullets players
Philippine Basketball Association imports
21st-century African-American people
20th-century African-American sportspeople